West Coker is a large village and civil parish in Somerset, England, situated  south west of Yeovil in the South Somerset district.

History
The name Coker comes from Coker Water ("crooked stream" from the Celtic Kukro).

Artifacts from early settlement in the parish include a polished stone axe and boat shaped-bronze brooch.  A Roman villa has been excavated and a bronze plate inscribed to the god Mars discovered. From this Mars was given the title Mars Rigisamus (which means "greatest king" or "king of kings") as it depicts a standing naked male figure with a close-fitting helmet; his right hand may have once held a weapon, and he probably originally also had a shield (both are now lost). The same epithet for a god is recorded from Bourges in Gaul. The use of this epithet implies that Mars had an extremely high status, over and above his warrior function.

The manor descended with its neighbour East Coker until the 14th century when it passed to a junior branch of the Courtenay family. It was later held by the Dukes of Somerset and Northumberland protectors of Edward VI and later still by the Portmans of Orchard Portman.

The original manor house burned down during an attack in the Wars of the Roses, although the current hamstone manor house has medieval origins, the earliest surviving portions probably being of around 1500. It is a grade I listed building.

The village had a long history of growing hemp and flax for sailcloth manufacture, which made "Coker Canvas" highly prized by naval captains during the Napoleonic Wars. Dawes Twine Works, a late 19th-century historic building in the village used for the manufacture of rope and twine, was a featured candidate on the BBC Restoration TV series in 2006. The ropewalk is on the Heritage at Risk Register.

Governance
The parish council has responsibility for local issues, including setting an annual precept (local rate) to cover the council’s operating costs and producing annual accounts for public scrutiny. The parish council evaluates local planning applications and works with the local police, district council officers, and neighbourhood watch groups on matters of crime, security, and traffic. The parish council's role also includes initiating projects for the maintenance and repair of parish facilities, as well as consulting with the district council on the maintenance, repair, and improvement of highways, drainage, footpaths, public transport, and street cleaning. Conservation matters (including trees and listed buildings) and environmental issues are also the responsibility of the council.
The Parish Council also looks after the recreation ground which has a pavilion, a tennis court, cricket pitches, children's sports areas and the Scouts and Guides buildings.

The village falls within the Non-metropolitan district of South Somerset, which was formed on 1 April 1974 under the Local Government Act 1972, having previously been part of Yeovil Rural District. The district council is responsible for local planning and building control, local roads, council housing, environmental health, markets and fairs, refuse collection and recycling, cemeteries and crematoria, leisure services, parks, and tourism.

Somerset County Council is responsible for running the largest and most expensive local services such as education, social services, libraries, main roads, public transport, policing and  fire services, trading standards, waste disposal and strategic planning.

The village is in 'Coker' electoral ward. The wards stretches from Odcombe in the north west to Barwick in the north east and Hardington Mandeville in the south west. The population of the ward at the 2011 census was 5,310.

It is also part of the Yeovil county constituency represented in the House of Commons of the Parliament of the United Kingdom. It elects one Member of Parliament (MP) by the first past the post system of election. It was part of the South West England constituency of the European Parliament prior to Britain leaving the European Union in January 2020, which elected seven MEPs using the d'Hondt method of party-list proportional representation.

Geography
Nearby is the Hardington Moor Site of Special Scientific Interest and national nature reserve where meadows are examples of species-rich unimproved neutral grassland, which is now nationally rare. The rare French oat-grass is very abundant on the site and the fields are home to a wide variety of plant species, most notably adder's tongue, corky-fruited water-dropwort and large numbers of green-winged orchid. Invertebrates found at the site include butterflies such as gatekeeper, small tortoiseshell and common blue. Less commonly seen are large skipper, green-veined white and green hairstreak.

Transport
The parish has no railway station, the nearest being Yeovil Junction on the West of England line. There are a few bus routes: the main ones are: Route 47 (First Hampshire & Dorset) Bridport-Yeovil which operates four journeys a day Monday to Friday and three journeys on Saturday and Sunday, and Route 96 which run approximately every 90 minutes on weekdays (SouthWest Coaches) Chard/Crewkerne-Yeovil.

Village features and services
West Coker is served by two pubs;— The Castle Inn and the Royal George. The castle Inn was completely gutted in 2013 by fire, although operated for a number of years after before being closing permanently in 2016. It is re-opening in April 2020 once again as a pub and restaurant after having a new refit. Near the village centre there is a garage (which carries out MoT tests, sells fuel and incorporates a local shop), a butcher's shop, a post office, Lanes Hotel/restaurant and a bistro. About one mile to the east are the Yeovil Court hotel and a petrol station and convenience store. There are other small businesses on the site of a former twine works in East Street.
West Coker Primary school has about 80 pupils.
The West Coker Commemoration Fund is a charity which administers the affairs of the village hall.

Literary Reference 
West Coker is Thomas Hardy's Narrowbourne, and features in the story A Tragedy of Two Ambitions in his collection Life's Little Ironies published in 1894.

Religious sites
The Church of Saint Martin of Tours has 13th- or 14th-century origins but was mostly rebuilt in 1863-64. Within the church is a quarter of the carpet used at the Coronation of Queen Elizabeth II.

Notable people
 Lieutenant-Colonel Sir Matthew Nathan, GCMG (1862–1939) a British soldier and civil servant, who variously served as the Governor of Sierra Leone, Gold Coast, Hong Kong, Natal and Queensland, died in the village.
 Lee Collins (1988-2021), professional footballer, notably for Port Vale and latterly captain of Yeovil Town died staying at the Lanes Hotel in the village.

See also
East Coker

References

Further reading
 Shorey, David, and Dodge, Michael and Nadine (2008). Book of West Coker: a pictorial and social history of a Somerset village, Wellington, Somerset: Halsgrove Publishing,

External links

 West Coker Village
 East Coker Society
Restoration of Dawes Twine Works

Villages in South Somerset
Civil parishes in Somerset